Anthoathecata, or the athecate hydroids, are an order of hydrozoans belonging to the phylum Cnidaria. A profusion of alternate scientific names exists for this long-known, heavily discussed, and spectacular group. It has also been called Gymnoblastea and (with or without an emended ending -ae), Anthomedusa, Athecata, Hydromedusa, and Stylasterina. There are about 1,200 species worldwide.

These hydrozoans always have a polyp stage. Their hydranths grow either solitary or in colonies. There is no firm perisarc around the polyp body. The medusae, or jellyfish, are solitary animals, with tentacles arising from the bell margin, lacking statocysts but possessing radial canals. Their gonads are on the manubrium ("handle").

Except in Eudendriidae and Laingiidae, prey can be captured by discharging harpoon-like structures (desmonemes) from chambers (cnidae) in specialized cells (nematocysts) on the tentacles. In hydrozoans, these are nearly always adhesive and entrapping, rather than puncturing and poisoned as in other jellys.

Systematics

The close relationship of the orders Anthoathecata and Leptomedusae has been long known, but formerly it was also believed that these two were close to the order Limnomedusae. However, their closest relatives are the highly advanced Siphonophorae, whereas the Limnomedusae are a rather primitive group, and not very closely related to these three Leptolinae, and might instead belong to the subclass Trachylinae.

Some uncertainty existed regarding the taxonomy of the order Anthoathecata. The most simple scheme, used until recently by most authors since it was proposed in 1913, divided the order into a smaller suborder (Filifera) and a second larger one (Capitata), but several unusual Anthoathecatae did not fit into this arrangement, and a considerable number did so awkwardly. The Porpitidae, for example, are a highly aberrant group, and were at one time even considered a separate order "Chondrophora".  However, they are currently considered to be derived from Zancleida.  In the early 21st century, the well-known Hydra and its relatives – and most of the supposed filiferan infraorders Tubulariida and Moerisiida – were determined to be a very ancient lineage, recognized as suborder Aplanulata.  Although not all Anthoathecatae have been firmly placed in the phylogeny, most are fairly certainly assigned at least to one of the major subdivisions. As a notable exception, a prehistoric family, the Heterastridiidae, is still highly disputed regarding its relationships to the extant taxa, as are a small number of very aberrant and/or little-known species such as the aptly named Saccohydra problematica.

The family Clathrozoellidae is placed with the Filifera here; in others it is placed in the Leptomedusae and sometimes even synonymized with their family Clathrozoidae. By contrast, the supposed filiferan genus Anthohydra is in fact the leptomedusan Eugymnanthea; similarly, "Gammaria" is also a leptomedusan and properly spelled Grammaria.

The supposed athecate family Monobrachiidae is apparently a close relative of the Olindiasidae, and belongs in the Limnomedusae. Halammohydridae and Otohydridae, sometimes placed here, appear to be trachyline hydrozoans of the order Actinulidae.

Infraorders and families

Basal and incertae sedis Anthoathecata
 Genus Bibrachium Stechow, 1919
 Genus "Microstoma" Lesson, 1830 (nomen dubium; non G.Cuvier, 1816: preoccupied)
 Genus Saccohydra Billiard, 1914
 †Family Heterastridiidae (fossil)

Suborder Aplanulata Collins, Winkelman, Hadrys & Schierwater, 2005
 Family Acaulidae Fraser, 1924 (formerly in Tubulariida)
 Family Boeromedusidae Bouillon, 1995 (formerly in Moerisiida)
 Family Boreohydridae Westblad, 1947 (formerly in Tubulariida)
 Family Myriothelidae Hincks, 1868 (including Candelabridae, Symplectaneidae; formerly in Tubulariida)
 Family Corymorphidae Allman, 1872 (including Amalthaeidae, Branchiocerianthidae, Euphysidae, Hypolytidae , Monocaulidae, Paragotoeidae, Steenstrupiini, Trichorhizini; formerly in Tubulariida)
 Family Hydridae Dana, 1846 (formerly in Moerisiida)
 Family Margelopsidae Uchida, 1927 (including Pelagohydridae; formerly in Tubulariida)
 Family Paracorynidae Picard, 1957 (formerly in Tubulariida)
 Family Protohydridae Allman, 1888 (formerly in Moerisiida)
 Family Tubulariidae

Suborder Filifera Kühn, 1913

Basal or incertae sedis
 Genus Brinckmannia Schuchert & Reiswig, 2006
 Genus Favonia Péron & Lesueur, 1810 (nomen dubium)
 Genus Kinetocodium Kramp, 1921 (Margelina: Hydractiniidae?)
 Genus Lymnorea Péron & Lesueur, 1810 (= Limnorea; nomen dubium)
 Family Axoporidae Boschma, 1951 (fossil)
 Family Bythotiaridae Maas, 1905 (including Calycopsidae; Pandeida?)
 Family Clathrozoellidae Peña Cantero, Vervoort & Watson, 2003 (tentatively placed here)
 Family Cordylophoridae von Lendenfeld, 1885
 Family Jeanbouilloniidae Pagès, Flood & Youngbluth, 2006
 Family Oceaniidae (Margelina?)
 Family Tubiclavoididae Moura, Cunha & Schuchert, 2007 (Pandeida?)
Infraorder Margelina Haeckel, 1879 (disputed)
 Family Australomedusidae Russell, 1971 (including Platystomidae)
 Family Balellidae Stechow, 1922
 Family Bougainvilliidae
 Family Cytaeididae L.Agassiz, 1862
 Family Eucodoniidae Schuchert, 1996
 Family Hydractiniidae
 Family Ptilocodiidae Coward, 1909
 Family Rathkeidae Russell, 1953
 Family Rhysiidae  Hickson & Gravely, 1907; (tentatively placed here)
 Family Stylasteridae (tentatively placed here)
 Family Trichydridae Hincks, 1868
Infraorder Pandeida (disputed)
 Family Eudendriidae
 Family Magapiidae Schuchert & Bouillon, 2009 (formerly Laingiidae; tentatively placed here)
 Family Niobiidae Petersen, 1979
 Family Pandeidae
 Family Proboscidactylidae Hand & Hendrickson, 1950
 Family Protiaridae Haeckel, 1879
 Family Heterotentaculidae Schuchert, 2010 (formerly Russelliidae; tentatively placed here)

Suborder Capitata Kühn, 1913
Basal or incertae sedis
 Genus Cnidocodon Bouillon, 1978 (including Ramus)
 Genus Ctenaria (Zancleida: Zancleidae?)
 Genus Oonautes Damas, 1937 (Zancleida: Zancleidae?)
 Genus Paulinum Brinckmann-Voss & Arai, 1998
 Genus Plotocnide Wagner, 1885 (including Plankayon)
 Genus Propachycordyle Thiel, 1931
 Genus Pteronema Haeckel, 1879
 Genus Rhabdoon Keferstein & Ehlers, 1861 (including Pararhysomedusa, Rhysomedusa, Yakovia)
 Genus Tetraralphia Pagès & Bouillon, 1997
Infraorder Moerisiida Poche, 1914 (disputed)
 Family Halimedusidae Arai & Brinckmann-Voss, 1980 (tentatively placed here)
 Family Moerisiidae Poche, 1914
Infraorder Sphaerocorynida Petersen, 1990 (disputed)
 Family Hydrocorynidae Rees, 1957
 Family Sphaerocorynidae Prévot, 1959
 Family Zancleopsidae Bouillon, 1978
Infraorder N.N. (disputed)
 Family Cladonematidae
 Family Corynidae
 Family Euphysidae
 Family Pennariidae McCrady, 1859 (including Halocordylidae)
 Family Solanderiidae
 Family Tricyclusidae Kramp, 1949
Infraorder Zancleida Russell, 1953 (disputed)
 Family Asyncorynidae Kramp, 1949
 Family Cladocorynidae Allman, 1872
 Family Milleporidae Fleming, 1828 (= Milleporadae)
 Family Porpitidae
 Family Pseudosolanderiidae Bouillon & Gravier-Bonnet, 1988
 Family Rosalindidae Bouillon, 1985
 Family Teissieridae Bouillon, 1978
 Family Zancleidae Russell, 1953 (including Corynipteridae, Halocorynidae, Orthocorynidae)

References

Bibliography
 Buecher, E., Goy, J. & Gibbons, M.J. 2005. Hydromedusae of the Agulhas Current. African Invertebrates 46: 27-69.

External links

North East Atlantic Taxa
Family, genus and species list
A page about Hydromedusae

Hydroidolina
Cnidarian orders